The First Kiss is a 1928 American silent romantic drama film directed by Rowland V. Lee and starring Fay Wray and Gary Cooper. Based on the short story Four Brothers by Tristram Tupper, the film is about a Chesapeake Bay fisherman who turns to pirating in order to be rich enough to marry a society girl.

The First Kiss was produced by Famous Players-Lasky and released by Paramount Pictures. Today it is considered to be a lost film. Some filming took place on the Chesapeake Bay in Saint Michaels, Maryland.

Cast
 Fay Wray as Anna Lee
 Gary Cooper as Mulligan Talbot
 Lane Chandler as William Talbot
 Leslie Fenton as Carol Talbot
 Paul Fix as Ezra Talbot
 Malcolm Williams as Pap
 Monroe Owsley as Other Suitor

References

External links

Stills #1, #2, #3, and #4 at Talbot County and the Movies, Talbot County Free Library

1928 films
Lost American films
American silent feature films
Films directed by Rowland V. Lee
Films based on short fiction
Paramount Pictures films
American romantic drama films
Films produced by B. P. Schulberg
American black-and-white films
Lost romantic drama films
1928 lost films
1928 romantic drama films
Films shot in Maryland
Works about Chesapeake Bay
Eastern Shore of Maryland in fiction
1920s American films
Silent romantic drama films
Silent American drama films